Laurie Baker (born November 6, 1976) is an American ice hockey player. She won a gold medal at the 1998 Winter Olympics and a silver medal at the 2002 Winter Olympics.

Awards and honors
1997 USA Hockey Women's Player of the Year Award  (also known as the Bob Allen Women's Player of the Year award) 
Inducted into the Providence College Athletics Hall of Fame on Saturday, February 13, 2016.

Personal life
Laurie Baker lives in Concord, MA, with her husband, Craig, and two kids. She also works as the assistant athletic director at Concord Academy.

References

External links
 bio

1976 births
American women's ice hockey forwards
Ice hockey players from Massachusetts
Ice hockey players at the 1998 Winter Olympics
Ice hockey players at the 2002 Winter Olympics
Living people
Medalists at the 1998 Winter Olympics
Medalists at the 2002 Winter Olympics
Olympic gold medalists for the United States in ice hockey
Olympic silver medalists for the United States in ice hockey
People from Concord, Massachusetts
Providence Friars women's ice hockey players
Sportspeople from Middlesex County, Massachusetts